The DuPont-Guest Estate, now known as the NYIT de Seversky Mansion, is a historic estate located at Brookville in Nassau County, New York. Since 1972, it has been part of the Old Westbury campus of the New York Institute of Technology (NYIT).

History

The home, originally called "White Eagle", was built between 1916 and 1918 for Alicia Heyward (née Bradford) Maddox, the second wife of Alfred I. du Pont and daughter of Judge Edward Bradford.  It was designed by the architectural firm of Carrère and Hastings in the Georgian Revival style and the interiors were designed by Charles of London.  The residence is two stories plus a basement level, with a red brick façade, white marble and limestone embellishments, and a gabled, slate roof. Alicia du Pont died in January 1920 before the home was finished.

The estate consists of the residence, surrounding landscaping, and garage. It adjoined Harbor Hill, the country seat of Clarence Mackay (to the north), and the home of Harry Payne Whitney (who married Gertrude Vanderbilt) (to the south).  It was near to the "homes of many of America's leading financiers, including Nicholas F. Brady, Otto H. Kahn, J. Pierpont Morgan, Thomas H. Hitchcock, Elbert H. Gary and Ormond G. Smith."

Later ownership
In 1921, the estate (which had been completed and fully furnished in January 1921, but never lived in), which was valued at over $1,500,000, was to be sold at public auction conducted by Arthur C. Sheridan for the benefit of Mrs. du Pont's child by her first marriage, Alicia Maddox, who had been adopted by Alfred du Pont.  It was sold for $470,000 to David T. Layman Jr., who was understood to be acting for Howard C. Phipps of the Phipps family.

The property was purchased in the 1920s by Frederick Guest (husband of Amy Phipps) and his family, who called it "Templeton".  It was listed on the National Register of Historic Places in 2009.

Since 1972, it has been part of the Old Westbury campus of the New York Institute of Technology (NYIT).

References

External links
 NYIT de Seversky Mansion website

Houses on the National Register of Historic Places in New York (state)
Georgian Revival architecture in New York (state)
Houses completed in 1918
Houses in Nassau County, New York
National Register of Historic Places in Nassau County, New York
Gilded Age mansions